Peko may refer to:
Peko, an ancient Estonian and Finnish god of crops
Peko (Seto epics) by Anne Vabarna
Peko (surname)
Peko, a fictional cartoon dog, namesake of anime film Doraemon: New Nobita's Great Demon—Peko and the Exploration Party of Five
Peko-chan, a fictional cartoon girl, the mascot of Japanese food brand Fujiya
Peko, stage name for Japanese singer Eiko Shimamiya

See also
Peko Hills, a range of hills in Nevada, US
Mont Péko, a mountain in Ivory Coast
Peko Mine, a gold mine near Tennant Creek, Australia